Boreotrophon alaskanus is a species of sea snail, a marine gastropod mollusk in the family Muricidae, the murex snails or rock snails.

Description
The shell is bone to creamy white in color with an elevated spire, a very distinct suture, and a strongly curved, long, slender siphonal canal. The shell has two nuclear whorls (which are typically eroded) and five subsequent whorls.  The whorls are rounded and bear 8 to 10 narrow varices which are prominent at the shoulder, where they rise into long blunt spines that curve towards the axis of the shell.  The aperture is subovate, and the operculum is thin and light brown.  Length 14 to 45 mm.

Distribution
This snail occurs in the Bering Sea north of Unalaska to northern Honshu, Japan.

References

Boreotrophon
Gastropods described in 1902